Honey Locust Honky Tonk is the nineteenth studio album by American musician Robert Pollard. It was released in July 2013 under GBV Inc. Records.

Track list

References

2013 albums
Robert Pollard albums
Fire Records (UK) albums